6545 Leitus, provisional designation: , is a Jupiter trojan from the Greek camp, approximately  in diameter. It was discovered on 5 October 1986, by Slovak astronomer Milan Antal at the Piwnice Astronomical Observatory in Poland. The dark D-type asteroid has a rotation period of 16.3 hours and belongs to the 90 largest Jupiter trojans. Numbered in 1995, it was named in 2021, after the Argonaut Leitus from Greek mythology, who fought in the Trojan War.

Orbit and classification 

Leitus is a dark Jovian asteroid orbiting in the leading Greek camp at Jupiter's  Lagrangian point, 60° ahead of the Gas Giant's orbit in a 1:1 resonance . It is also a non-family asteroid in the Jovian background population. It orbits the Sun at a distance of 4.9–5.4 AU once every 11 years and 8 months (4,265 days; semi-major axis of 5.15 AU). Its orbit has an eccentricity of 0.05 and an inclination of 12° with respect to the ecliptic. The body's observation arc begins with its official discovery observation at Piwnice in October 1986.

Numbering and naming 

This minor planet was numbered on 9 September 1995. On 29 November 2021, IAU's Working Group Small Body Nomenclature  it after the Argonaut Leitus from Greek mythology. He was one of the seven Achaean Leaders in front of whom Poseidon appeared during the Trojans' attack on the Achaean ships, urging them to fight back instead of acting like cowards. Wounded by Hector, Leitus was one of the few to safely return home after the Trojan War.

Physical characteristics 

In the SDSS-based taxonomy, Leitus is dark D-type asteroid, which agrees with the determined spectral type by Pan-STARRS. Its V–I color index of 0.91 is typical for most larger Jupiter trojans (also see table below).

Rotation period 

In March 2013, a rotational lightcurve of Leitus was obtained from photometric observations by Robert Stephens at the Center for Solar System Studies in Landers, California. Lightcurve analysis gave a rotation period of  hours with a brightness amplitude of 0.31 magnitude.

Diameter and albedo 

According to the survey carried out by the NEOWISE mission of NASA's Wide-field Infrared Survey Explorer and the Infrared Astronomical Satellite IRAS, Leitus measures 50.95 and 56.96 kilometers in diameter and its surface has an albedo of 0.068 and 0.0545, respectively. The Collaborative Asteroid Lightcurve Link assumes a standard albedo for a carbonaceous asteroid of 0.057 and calculates a diameter of 53.16 kilometers based on an absolute magnitude of 10.1.

Notes

References

External links 
 Asteroid Lightcurve Database (LCDB), query form (info )
 Discovery Circumstances: Numbered Minor Planets (5001)-(10000) – Minor Planet Center
 
 

006545
Named minor planets
Discoveries by Milan Antal
19861005